Walter Reich is an American magazine editor, psychiatrist, and writer. He was the 2003 recipient of the AAAS Award for Scientific Freedom and Responsibility.

Appointments
In the past, Reich held the roles of director of the U.S. Holocaust Memorial Museum, located in Washington, D.C. ensuring its establishment as an educational institute with serious scholarship; at Yale University, located in New Haven, Connecticut; a resident in psychiatry, working at the National Institute of Mental Health, located in Washington, D.C.; and was co-chair of the Committee of Concerned Scientists, located in New York City, New York.

, he held the positions of: Yitzhak Rabin Memorial Professor of International Affairs, Ethics and Human Behavior at the George Washington University, located in Washington, D.C.; a contributing editor of The Wilson Quarterly; senior scholar at the Woodrow Wilson International Center for Scholars, located in Washington, D.C.; a lecturer in psychiatry at Yale University; and a professor of psychiatry at the Uniformed Services University of the Health Sciences, located in Bethesda, Maryland. He was a fellow of the Kennan Institute for Advanced Russian Studies of the Woodrow Wilson International Center for Scholars.

Awards
In 2003–2004, Reich received the AAAS Award for Scientific Freedom and Responsibility. He has also received the Solomon A. Berson Medical Alumni Achievement Award in Health Science from the New York University School of Medicine.

Publications
Reich wrote A Stranger in My House: Jews and Arabs in the West Bank (published by Holt), co-wrote State of the Struggle: Report on the Battle Against Global Terrorism (published by Brookings Institution Press), and edited Origins of Terrorism: Psychologies, Ideologies, Theologies, States of Mind (co-published by Johns Hopkins University Press and Woodrow Wilson Center Press). He has also contributed to various publications, including:

 The New York Times
 The Washington Post
 The Los Angeles Times
 The Wall Street Journal
 The Atlantic Monthly
 Harper's
 Commentary
 The New Republic

Family
Reich is married to novelist Tova Reich (Sister of Rabbi Avi Weiss). They have three children, among them archaeogeneticist David Reich.

See also

 List of American scientists
 List of George Washington University faculty
 List of people from Maryland
 List of people from Washington, D.C.
 List of psychiatrists
 List of Yale University people

References

External links
 

Year of birth missing (living people)
Place of birth missing (living people)
Living people
20th-century births
20th-century American non-fiction writers
20th-century American physicians
21st-century American non-fiction writers
21st-century American physicians
American magazine editors
American male non-fiction writers
American psychiatrists
George Washington University faculty
Chairpersons of non-governmental organizations
Directors of museums in the United States
Journalists from New York City
National Institutes of Health people
Physicians from New Haven, Connecticut
Smithsonian Institution people
Uniformed Services University of the Health Sciences faculty
Yale University faculty
Writers from Maryland
Writers from New Haven, Connecticut
Writers from New York City
Writers from Washington, D.C.
20th-century American male writers
21st-century American male writers